Enoclerus laetus is a species of checkered beetle in the family Cleridae. It is found in Central America and North America.

Subspecies
These five subspecies belong to the species Enoclerus laetus:
 Enoclerus laetus abruptus (LeConte, 1858)
 Enoclerus laetus chapini Wolcott, 1922
 Enoclerus laetus intergivus Barr, 1976
 Enoclerus laetus laetus (Klug, 1842)
 Enoclerus laetus nexus Barr, 1976

References

Further reading

 
 

Clerinae
Articles created by Qbugbot
Beetles described in 1842